The United States competed at the 2016 Winter Youth Olympics in Lillehammer, Norway, from 12 to 21 February 2016.

Medalists

Medalists in mixed NOCs events

Alpine Skiing 

Boys

Girls

Parallel mixed team

Biathlon

Boys

Girls

Mixed

Bobsleigh

Cross-country skiing

Boys

Girls

Curling

Mixed team

Team
 Skip: Luc Violette
 Third: Cora Farrell
 Second: Ben Richardson
 Lead: Cait Flannery

Round Robin

Draw 1

Draw 2

Draw 3

Draw 4

Draw 5

Draw 6

Draw 7

Quarterfinals

Semifinals

Gold Medal Game

Final Rank:

Mixed doubles

Round of 32

Round of 16

Figure skating

Singles

Couples

Mixed NOC team trophy

Freestyle skiing

Halfpipe

Ski cross

Slopestyle

Ice hockey

The United States sent one boys' ice hockey team consisting of 17 athletes.

Boys' tournament
The team roster is listed as follows:

Coaching staff
Head Coach: Scott Paluch
Assistant Coach: J. D. Forrest

Group Stage

Semifinals

Gold medal game

Final Rank:

Luge

Individual sleds

Mixed team relay

Nordic combined 

Individual

Nordic mixed team

Short track speed skating

Boys

Mixed team relay

Qualification Legend: FA=Final A (medal); FB=Final B (non-medal); FC=Final C (non-medal); FD=Final D (non-medal); SA/B=Semifinals A/B; SC/D=Semifinals C/D; ADV=Advanced to Next Round; PEN=Penalized

Skeleton

Ski jumping 

Individual

Team

Snowboarding

Halfpipe

Snowboard cross

Slopestyle

Snowboard and ski cross relay

Qualification legend: FA – Qualify to medal round; FB – Qualify to consolation round

Speed skating

Boys

Mixed team sprint

See also
 United States at the 2016 Summer Olympics

References

Nations at the 2016 Winter Youth Olympics
United States at the Youth Olympics
2016 in American sports